Guido Barilla (born 30 July 1958) is an Italian billionaire businessman, and the chairman of Barilla Group, the world's largest pasta company, which is 85% owned by Guido, a sister and two brothers.

Early life
Guido Barilla was born on 30 July 1958 in Milan, Italy. He studied in the United States and in Italy, where he studied Philosophy at the Università Statale di Milano.

Career
He started his career in 1982 in the sales department of Barilla France. In 1986, he became a senior manager and led the international expansion of the company. In 1988, he became Barilla deputy chairman, and since October 1993 has been the chairman.

Since 2009, he has been chairman of the Barilla Center for Food & Nutrition, now Fondazione Barilla.

In a 2013 radio interview, Barilla stated his opposition to adoptions by same-sex couples and said that he "disagrees" with homosexuals. The comments were viewed as homophobic, and, although Barilla apologized for "having offended the sensibilities of many", critics like Alessandro Zan felt the apology was insufficient and encouraged a boycott of Barilla's company. The negative reaction led to changes, and a year later, the company received a top rating from the Human Rights Campaign's list of employers who are LGBT-friendly.

Parma Calcio 1913
In 2015, Barilla became a part owner of the Phoenix club Parma Calcio 1913

Honours
In May 2019, he was awarded the title Knight of the Order of Merit for Labour.

Other activities
 Danone, Member of the Mission Committee (since 2020)
 European Round Table of Industrialists (ERT), Member

Personal life
Barilla is married, with five children, and lives in Parma, Italy.

References

1958 births
Guido
Italian billionaires
Businesspeople from Milan
Living people
Businesspeople from Parma